Flaminia may refer to:

Historic places
Via Flaminia, a Roman consular road that connected Rome to Rimini
Via Flaminia minor, an ancient Roman road between Bononia and Arretium
Flaminia et Picenum, a province of the Dioecesis Italiciana created by the emperor Diocletian (III-IV century); see Romagna
Flaminia et Picenum Annonarium, a province of Italy Annonaria, created by the emperor Theodosius I (late 4th century); see Roman Italy

People 
 Flaminia gens, an ancient Roman family
 Flaminia Cinque (born 1964), English actress
 Barbara Flaminia (1540–1586), Italian stage actress

Vehicles 
 Lancia Flaminia, car produced by Lancia from 1957 to 1970
 MSC Flaminia, a German container ship 
 SS Flaminian, three steamships of the Ellerman & Papyanni Line
 , a passengership in service 1955-64

Other uses
 Flaminia, one of the Innamorati characters from the Italian Commedia dell'arte
 Flaminia (bug), a genus in the family Pentatomidae

See also
 Flaminio (disambiguation)